Kotla Faqir is a village and union council of Jhelum District in the Punjab Province of Pakistan. It is part of Jhelum Tehsil, and is located at 32°54'0N 73°41'0E with an altitude of 218 metres (718 feet).

References

Populated places in Tehsil Jhelum
Union councils of Jhelum Tehsil